Yan Sheng or Yansheng or variation, may refer to:

Places
 Yansheng (演圣镇), a town in Jiange County, Sichuan Province, China

People
 Duke Yansheng (衍聖公; Holy Duke of Yen), a traditional ceremonial title of Chinese nobility held within the Kong Clan for descendants of Kong Fu Zi (Confucius)

Given named "Yan-sheng"
 Chen Yansheng (陈演生), leader of the Chinese political party China Zhi Gong Party
 Dong Yansheng, award-winning translator into Chinese, winner of the Lu Xun Literary Prize
 Li Yan-sheng (9th century CE), a famed participant in the Tang Dynasty Imperial Examination that exacerbated the Hua–Yi distinction
 Wu Yansheng (吴彦晟; born 1984), Chinese soccer player
 Yang Yansheng (杨雁盛; born 1988), Chinese polevaulter

Fictional characters
 General Shi Yan-sheng, a fictional character from the 1993 Hong King film Temptation of a Monk

Surnamed "Yan" given named "Sheng"

Fictional characters
 Yan Sheng (殷勝), a fictional character from the Hong Kong film Endgame (2021 film)

Other uses
 Yansheng coin (厭勝錢), decorative coins used for traditional Chinese rituals and as amulets

See also

 Yasheng Huang, Chinese professor of management at MIT
 Yang Sheng (disambiguation)
 Sheng (disambiguation)
 Yan (disambiguation)
 
 
 Shenyang (disambiguation)